Sinoctenus is a monotypic genus of East Asian wandering spiders containing the single species, Sinoctenus zhui. A male was first described by Yuri M. Marusik, F. Zhang & M. M. Omelko in 2012, but no female has yet been described. It has only been found in China.

References

Ctenidae
Monotypic Araneomorphae genera
Spiders of China